Escapade is an album by saxophonist James Spaulding which was recorded in 1999 and released on the HighNote label.

Reception

The AllMusic review by Michael G. Nastos stated "Spaulding's tart-sweet alto sax has never sounded better, while his pristine flute playing is easily in the top ten of late-'90s jazz performers. ... Spaulding shows a consistency within mainstream parameters, a real sense of teamwork with these worthy session mates, and a willingness to take chances".

Track listing
 "Escapade" (Kenny Dorham) – 5:55
 "Cheese Cake" (Dexter Gordon) – 6:41
 "Warm Valley" (Duke Ellington) – 5:16
 "Madeline" (Hank Mobley) – 5:10
 "Just One of Those Things" (Cole Porter) – 4:50
 "Grant's Future" (Grant Green) – 6:36
 "High Modes" (Mobley) – 6:47
 "The Break Through" (Mobley) – 5:08
 "It Could Happen to You" (Jimmy Van Heusen, Johnny Burke) – 5:27
 "La Mesha" (Dorham) – 6:21

Personnel
James Spaulding – alto saxophone, flute, bass flute
Don Sickler – trumpet, flugelhorn (tracks 1, 2, 6-8 & 10)
John Hicks – piano 
Ray Drummond – bass 
Kenny Washington – drums

References

HighNote Records albums
James Spaulding albums
2000 albums
Albums recorded at Van Gelder Studio